BFF: Best Friends Forever is a 2009 Filipino comedy film released by Star Cinema. It stars Sharon Cuneta, Ai-Ai delas Alas and John Estrada. The film was released domestically on May 13, 2009.

Plot
Honey (Sharon Cuneta) is a housewife married to Tim (John Estrada). She gets a nagging feeling that her husband is being unfaithful. She realizes that she has not been taking care of her personal appearance so she enrolls in a gym where she meets Frances (Ai-Ai delas Alas) who has a boyfriend named TJ. TJ and Tim are the same person.

TJ is in the car with Frances, talking, but soon he realizes that Frances is pregnant with his baby. He starts crying, but Frances mistakes them for tears of joy.

Then, Honey and Frances are in the restaurant having a good time. Frances passes out, when her phone starts ringing. Honey answers Frances's phone and Tim answers. Thinking that he was talking to Frances, he tells her that he is sorry, but he is married with three children. Honey was enraged that Tim cheated on her with Frances, and plots to get revenge on Frances and tries to keep Tim from getting close to Frances ever again. After a series of events, they find out that Tim was to blame. Honey and Frances are BFFs again and Honey forgives Tim.

Tim was so happy, and he starts jumping in joy shouting "Yahoo!!!", but he gets hit by a car and dies. After that, Frances and Honey continue to be BFFs.

Cast
Sharon Cuneta as Honey
Ai-Ai delas Alas as Frances
John Estrada as Tim/TJ
Empress Schuck as Nina
Miles Ocampo as Katkat
AJ Perez as Miguel
Enchong Dee as Paco
DJ Durano as Eric
Gina Pareño as Lola
Chokoleit as Bona
Joy Viado as Daisy
Nash Aguas as Paupau
Helga Krapf, Kiray Celis and Krista Valle as Mean Girls
Carl Camo as Junjun
Carlos Morales as Chito
Dang Cruz as Edna
Gabby Concepcion as the new guy prospect (uncredited)

Reception

Box office
The film was a box office success. The film grossed P43.6 million on its opening weekend. The film had grossed P102.5 million on its entire theatrical run.

References

External links

2009 films
Star Cinema films
Philippine comedy films
Films directed by Wenn V. Deramas
2009 comedy films